The year 2011 was the 40th year after the independence of Bangladesh. It was also the third year of the second term of the Government of Sheikh Hasina.

Incumbents

 President: Zillur Rahman
 Prime Minister: Sheikh Hasina
 Chief Justice: A.B.M. Khairul Haque (until 15 May 2011), Md. Muzammel Hossain (from 16 May 2011).

Demography

Climate

Economy

Note: For the year 2011 average official exchange rate for BDT was 74.15 per US$.

Events

 7 January – Widespread outrage at the killing of Felani Khatun a 15-year-old Bangladeshi girl, who was shot and killed by India's Border Security Force (BSF), at India-Bangladesh border.
 17 February – Bangladesh co-hosted the ICC Cricket World Cup with India and Sri Lanka. The Opening Ceremony of the event was held in the venue Bangabandhu National Stadium in Dhaka.
 11 July – At least 40 people, including 38 students, were killed when a pick-up truck carrying them veered off the road and plunged into a roadside ditch at Mayani area of Mirsharai Upazila.
 13 August – Acclaimed film director Tareque Masud and his long-time co-worker Mishuk Munier, a cinematographer, a journalist and CEO of ATN News died in a road accident on the Dhaka-Aricha highway at Joka under Ghior Upazila while returning to Dhaka from Manikganj after visiting a shooting location.
 5 September – India and Bangladesh sign a pact to end their 40-year border demarcation dispute.
 16 October – Small share market investors went on a fast-unto-death after forming the Bangladesh Capital Market Investors' Council in response to the bear run in the share market since end of 2010. Opposition politicians declared their solidarity with the protesters.
 22 October – The market stabilisation fund (MSF), worth BDT 50 billion ($ 667 million), was conceived by the Bangladesh Association of Banks (BAB) as a method to increase liquidity in the market and increase share prices, in response to share market scam.
 December: A planned coup to establish Islamic law in Bangladesh was stopped by the Bangladesh Army. A number of officers including retired ones were arrested.

Awards and Recognitions

Independence Day Award

Bangladesh Freedom Honour
The highest state award given by the government of Bangladesh for foreigners or non-nationals was posthumously conferred on former Indian prime minister Indira Gandhi on 25 July 2011. The award recognises her role as an ally during the Bangladeshi war of independence and her capacity to manage such a complex regional war. A Bangladeshi national committee had nominated her for the special honour for her "unique" role in "offering training to freedom fighters and refuge to millions of people who fled the country and building world opinion for Bangladesh's independence". Indian National Congress Party president Sonia Gandhi, the daughter -in-law of Indira Gandhi, received the award from Bangladeshi President Zillur Rahman at a grand ceremony in Dhaka attended by Prime Minister Sheikh Hasina and nearly 1,000 top dignitaries.

Ekushey Padak
 Mosharef Uddin Ahmed, Language Movement (posthumous)
 Shawkat Ali, Language Movement (posthumous)
 Nurjahan Begum, journalism
 Jyotsna Biswas, performing arts
 Abdul Haq Choudhury, research (posthumous)
 Abdul Haq, language and literature
 Amanul Haque, Language Movement
 Md Abul Hashem, social service
 Mohammed Delwar Hossain, social service
 Shaheed Quaderi, language and literature
 Ustad Akthar Sadmani, performing arts (posthumous)
 Abdul Karim Shah, performing arts
 Polan Sarkar, social service

Sports
 Football:
 Bangladesh competed in the Group A of 2012 AFC Challenge Cup qualification held in Myanmar in March. Although Bangladesh secured a surprise victory over the hosts, they lost to Palestine and Philippines to exit the tournament without qualifying.
 In August, the youth team competed in the 2011 SAFF U-16 Championship held in Nepal. Bangladesh secured fourth position in the tournament.
 In November the national team competed in the 2011 SAFF Championship held in New Delhi, India. Bangladesh could not secure any victory in the tournament.
 Sheikh Jamal Dhanmondi Club secured their first title of Premier League.
 Cricket:
 Bangladesh co-hosted with India and Sri Lanka the 2011 Cricket World Cup from February to April 2011. Bangladesh did not fare well and failed in qualifying for quarter-finals stage. Other than victories against Associate members, their only notable victory was against England.
 The Australian cricket team toured Bangladesh between 7 and 13 April. The tour consisted of three One Day Internationals (ODIs). Australia won all the matches in the tour
 The Bangladesh cricket team toured Zimbabwe from 4 to 21 August. The tour consisted of one Test match and five One Day Internationals (ODIs) played against the Zimbabwean national team and one first-class match played against a Zimbabwean representative team. The Test match was Zimbabwe's first since India toured Zimbabwe in 2005. Zimbabwe won the Test match by 130 runs and also won the one-day series 3–2.
 The West Indies toured Bangladesh in October 2011 and playing two Test matches, the West Indies winning the second, the first being a drawn game. West Indies played three limited overs internationals, winning the series 2–1. Bangladesh won a T20I by 3 wickets.
 Pakistan toured from 29 November to 21 December 2011, playing one Twenty20 International (T20I), three One Day Internationals (ODIs) and two Test matches, Pakistan winning all matches.

Deaths

 16 March – Khandaker Delwar Hossain, politician (b. 1933)
 3 May – Ila Majumder, singer (b. 1941)
 6 May – Kazi Nuruzzaman, war hero (b. 1925)
 23 May – Pilu Momtaz, singer (b. 1953)
 7 June – Mohammad Kibria, artist (b. 1929)
 21 June – Kazi Zaker Husain, zoologist (b. 1930s)
 13 August – Tareque Masud, film director (b. 1956)
 13 August – Mishuk Munier, broadcast journalist (b. 1959)
 10 October – Shah Muhammad Hasanuzzaman, agriculturist (b. 1920)
 19 October – Munshi Siddique Ahmad, scientist (b. 1924)
 7 November – Aminul Islam, artist (b. 1931)
 13 November – Imdad Hossain, artist (b. 1926)
 13 December – Kabir Chowdhury, educationist, author (b. 1923)
 28 December – Razia Khan, poet (b. 1936)
 30 December – Muhammad Hamidullah Khan, war hero (b. 1938)

See also 
 2010s in Bangladesh
 List of Bangladeshi films of 2011
 2011–12 Bangladeshi cricket season
 Timeline of Bangladeshi history

References